The Skirrow was an English automobile manufactured between 1936 and 1939.  A midget racing car produced by Harry Skirrow, based in Ambleside, Cumbria, it used a 1000 cc JAP engine and was both unusual and highly noteworthy in having chain drive to all four wheels.

See also
 List of car manufacturers of the United Kingdom

References
David Burgess Wise, The New Illustrated Encyclopedia of Automobiles.

External links
A page dedicated to midget racers
'MotoFreaks' - with photos of Harry Skirrow and his cars

Defunct motor vehicle manufacturers of England
Companies based in Cumbria